Ponant (officially, Compagnie du Ponant (CDP); "Ponant Company") is a French cruise ship operator. It was founded in April 1988 by Philippe Videau, Jean-Emmanuel Sauvé, and other officers of the French Merchant Navy and launched the first French cruise ship. The company operates eleven ships, all of which operate under the French flag.

History
Ponant started out with one ship, Le Ponant, a three masted Barque built in 1991. Le Ponant still operates with the company today. Eight years later in 1999, the company acquired Le Levant, a yacht. After 13 years in service with Ponant, Le Levant was purchased by Paul Gauguin Cruises in 2012 and became Tere Moana. In 2004, Ponant purchased Le Diamant, a luxury liner. Le Diamant transferred to Quark Expeditions in 2012 to become Ocean Diamond.

Later, in 2010, Ponant put into service the first of a series of four identical luxury sister ships, Le Boreal. A year later, the company began operating the second ship of the class, L'Austral and in 2013 the third ship of the class was added to the fleet, Le Soléal. The fourth ship of the class, Le Lyrial, was delivered in 2015.

Initially based in Nantes for 18 years, in 2006 the company headquarters was moved to Marseille following its acquisition by CMA CGM. In 2012, CMA CGM sold Ponant to Bridgepoint Capital.

On April 4, 2008, Le Ponant was seized by Somali pirates in the Gulf of Aden while en route from the Seychelles to the Mediterranean. The ship carried no passengers at the time of its capture, but all 30 crewmembers were taken hostage. The hostages were released without incident on April 12. Following the release, French helicopters tracked the pirates  to the village of Jariban. French commando marine and GIGN operating from the frigate Jean Bart and the Jeanne d'Arc moved in when the pirates attempted to flee in the desert. A sniper disabled the get-away vehicle, and the commandos were able to capture six men. Local officials claimed that three people died in the raid, with a further eight wounded, but France denied this. Troops also recovered some of the ransom money paid by the owner of the yacht for the release of its crew. The six captured pirates have since been flown to Paris, where they shall face trial.

In 2012, the owner of Compagnie du Ponant, CMA CGM, sold the company to Bridgepoint Capital.

In 2013, one of Ponant's ships, Le Soleal, became the first French commercial shipping vessel to traverse the Northwest Passage. The vessel left Kangerlussuaq in Greenland on August 26, 2013, and arrived in Anadyr, in Russia on September 16, 2013.

In 2015, Groupe Artémis bought Compagnie du Ponant from Bridgepoint.

In March 2016, Ponant ordered four new ships with about 10,000 GT at Vard, a subcompany of Fincantieri. They were delivered in 2018 and 2019. The ships are named Le Lapérouse, Le Champlain, Le Bougainville and Le Dumont-d'Urville.

In December 2017, Le Lapérouse left Vard Tulcea in Romania and was heading to final outfitting at Vard facility in Norway. She arrived in mid of January.

In December 2017, Ponant announced that it had ordered an icebreaking expedition cruise ship from Vard. The  (about €274 million) vessel will be built to the second-highest IACS ice class, Polar Class 2, and will be capable of taking tourists to the North Pole. The vessel, named Le Commandant Charcot, is scheduled for delivery in 2021.

In March 2018, Ponant announced the order of two additional 180-passenger expedition ships, Le Bellot and Le Jaques Cartier; they joined the company in 2020.

In 2019 Ponant purchased Paul Gauguin Cruises owners of the Paul Gauguin.

In 2020 Ponant came under criticism for refusing to provide refunds to passengers from cancelled cruises due to COVID-19. During the pandemic, the ship did not sail for some time but resumed operations on 18 July 2020 for local residents and on 29 July for international guests, with reduced occupancy.

A news report on 3 August 2020 stated that the COVID-19 virus had been detected on the MS Paul Gauguin while it was in Papeete, Tahiti; passengers were required to stay in their cabins. At that time, after renovations, the capacity was stated to be 318 guests plus a crew of 216. The ship had been modified to use a "cleaner" fuel: LS MGO – Low-Sulphur Marine Gas Oil and the company planned "to offset 150 percent of its carbon emissions".

In spring 2020, Le Commandant Charcot was being built by Vard, Fincantieri shipbuilding subsidiary in Norway. This high polar exploration ship is equipped with a hybrid propulsion system which uses both electricity and liquefied natural gas (LNG). Delivered in August 2021 Le Commandant Charcot has a similar design to the PONANT Explorer series, though she is larger and more powerful. Due to the manoeuvrability of the Azipod systems, she can operate both in ahead direction and sternfirst, depending on the prevailing ice conditions. Le Commandant Charcot is also the first ship to feature a Polar Class 2 icebreaking hull.

On March 29, 2021, following the announcement of François-Henri Pinault, Managing Partner of Artémis, Hervé Gastinel took over after Jean-Emmanuel Sauvée as the company's CEO.

Current fleet

Former Fleet

References

External links

  Official website Ponant
  Ponant Website

 
Ponant
Ponant
Ponant
River cruise companies
1988 establishments in France
2012 mergers and acquisitions
2015 mergers and acquisitions